Aurora Publishing, Inc. was the American subsidiary of Japanese publisher Ohzora Publishing, the leading josei manga publisher in Japan. Headquartered in Torrance, California, it licensed and published Japanese manga for the North American market. Aurora Publishing's first release was Walkin' Butterfly under the shōjo imprint Aurora, which features manga targeting female readers in their teens and younger. Aurora Publishing also released manga under two other imprints: the yaoi imprint Deux Press featured female-oriented manga about homoerotic relations between beautiful men, while the josei imprint Luv Luv featured erotic romance manga targeting female readers in their late teens and up. Aurora Publishing distributed some of its manga via Netcomics.  In 2010, the Aurora office in California closed. The former employees of Aurora Publishing went on to found Manga Factory. Manga Factory lasted until at least June 2013 before it closed as well.

Publications
The following is a list of titles that was published by Aurora

References

External links
 
Flipped!: David Welsh Interviews Michael Perry Of Aurora by The Comics Reporter
Sequential Tart interview with Michael Perry

 
Defunct comics and manga publishing companies
Defunct publishing companies of the United States
Publishing companies based in California
2006 establishments in California
2010 disestablishments in California
Publishing companies established in 2006
Publishing companies disestablished in 2010
American subsidiaries of foreign companies
Companies based in Torrance, California
Defunct companies based in Greater Los Angeles
American companies established in 2006
American companies disestablished in 2010